Megan Shipman is an American voice actress, known for providing voices in English dubs of Japanese anime series. Some of her notable roles include Yuzu Aihara in Citrus, Aoba Suzukaze in New Game!, Grey in Black Clover, Maple in Bofuri, Sakura Adachi in Adachi and Shimamura, Komichi Akebi in Akebi's Sailor Uniform, and Anya Forger in Spy × Family.

Biography
Megan Shipman was born and raised in Dallas, Texas. She started voice acting while studying at Louisiana State University. After graduating with a bachelor's degree in music education, Shipman returned to Dallas to work as a middle school choir teacher. She later quit her job and pursued a voice acting career. Shipman is married.

Filmography

Anime series

Films

Video games

Awards and nominations

References

External links
 
 
 

21st-century American actresses
21st-century American singers
21st-century American women singers
Actresses from Dallas
American video game actresses
American voice actresses
Living people
Louisiana State University alumni
Year of birth missing (living people)